"The Confessor" is a song by Joe Walsh that appeared on his 1985 album of the same name. It is the longest song on the album clocking in at 7 minutes and 6 seconds, and it has two segments. The first segment is a slow acoustic intro, and Joe Walsh sings an introductory verse before the second segment, which is hard rock. After the slow introduction, the drums kick in, and Walsh sings a couple more verses before the instrumental bridge section, where he plays his solos and riffs. Although the song failed to chart on the Billboard Hot 100, it did manage to reach #8 on the Hot Mainstream Rock Tracks chart.

When Walsh toured Australia and the US, the song was on the set list.

References

Joe Walsh songs
1985 songs
Song recordings produced by Keith Olsen
Songs written by Joe Walsh
Full Moon Records singles